For the seeding of qualified teams at the 1998 FIFA World Cup, FIFA used the FIFA World Rankings in combination with performances of national teams in the three previous FIFA World Cups.

For the FIFA World Ranking part, points were allocated on the basis of 32 points for the highest ranked team of the 32 qualified teams at the end of each preceding three years, down to 1 point for the lowest ranked team.

For the World Cup performance part, points were allocated as follows:

 Teams qualified for the knockout stages were ranked by their overall performance and received between 32 points (World Cup winner) and 17 points (the losing team in the Round of 16 with the worst overall performance).
 Teams eliminated in the group stage were ranked by their performance. The top half received 9 points, the rest 8 points.

The seedings table calculated a sum of points scored by each national team from the 1986 FIFA World Cup, 1990 FIFA World Cup and the 1994 FIFA World Cup averaged in a 1:2:3 ratio respectively, that finally got multiplied by a 1.2 weighting factor to account for 60% of the total sum of points. The seedings table also calculated a sum of points scored by each national team from the FIFA World Rankings at the three given dates December 1995, December 1996 and November 1997, averaged in a 1:1:1 ratio and finally multiplied by a 0.8 weighting factor to account for 40% of the total sum of points. The total points were finally the sum of these two calculated totals.

France were seeded as hosts, Brazil as defending champions. The other seeds were: Germany, Italy, Spain, Argentina, Romania, and the Netherlands.

Broadcasting

France  
The 1998 FIFA World Cup seeding are broadcast live on TF1, France Television and Canal+

References

Seeding
FIFA World Cup seeding